Sarah Josephine Fabergé (born July 1958) is the only daughter of Theo Fabergé. She is a founding member of the Fabergé Heritage Council and Director of Special Projects for Fabergé.

Biography
Fabergé is the great-granddaughter of Peter Carl Fabergé. Through her father, she came into contact with the work of her great-grandfather. In 1994, after studies in design and silversmithing, she created her own designs for the St. Petersburg Collection. In March 2004, Fabergé was invited to Saint Petersburg with her son Joshua. With an official reception at the Hermitage Museum, the Mariinsky Theatre, and a major event at the prestigious Hotel Astoria, it celebrated the opening of an art gallery dedicated to the work of Sarah and her father Theo. Sarah's creation 'Neva Egg' is on permanent display at the St Petersburg City Museum.

In June 2006, Fabergé was commissioned to create the George Best Egg as a tribute. A limited edition of 68 eggs were produced, with all profits from the sale of the eggs going to the George Best Foundation, which promotes health through sport and supports people with alcohol and drug problems.

In January 2007, Pallinghurst Resources announced it had acquired Unilever's entire global portfolio of trademarks, licenses and associated rights relating to the Fabergé brand name. Later it announced the reunification of the Fabergé name with the family. Tatiana and Sarah Fabergé, both great-granddaughters of Peter Carl Fabergé, had become founder members of the Fabergé Heritage Council that was to counsel the unified Fabergé in its pursuit of excellence and creativity.

References

External links

1958 births
Living people
Sarah Faberge
English women artists
English jewellers
20th-century English artists
21st-century English artists
Women jewellers